Kurtar Beni is a 1987 Turkish romantic drama film, directed by Halit Refiğ and starring Gülsen Bubikoglu, Talat Bulut, and Tanju Gürsu.

References

External links
Kurtar Beni at the Internet Movie Database

1987 films
Turkish romantic drama films
1987 romantic drama films
Films directed by Halit Refiğ